The bighead catshark (Apristurus bucephalus) is a species of fish in the family Scyliorhinidae endemic to Australia. Its natural habitat is the open seas. It belongs to a genus of poorly known deep-water catsharks, and is recorded from only three specimens taken off Perth, Western Australia. This species could be rare or uncommon, and the effects of fisheries are unknown, though if its biology is like other deep-water shark species, it may not be sufficiently fecund to withstand exploitation pressures.

References

bighead catshark
Marine fish of Western Australia
bighead catshark
bighead catshark
Taxa named by Peter R. Last
Taxa named by John J. Pogonoski
Taxonomy articles created by Polbot